Scott B. Bizar is the founder of Fantasy Games Unlimited, a game publisher which contracts writers and artists that work primarily on role-playing games.

Career
Scott Bizar, dissatisfied with TSR's Dungeons & Dragons (1974) and Warriors of Mars (1974), founded his own company, Fantasy Games Unlimited (FGU). The company's first two products were Hugh McGowan's Gladiators (1975), a man-to-man miniatures combat system, and Royal Armies of the Hyborean Age (1975), a first-of-its kind wargame set in the world of Conan, was co-designed by Bizar's roommate, Lin Carter. At Gen Con IX in 1976, Edward E. Simbalist and Wilf K. Backhaus met Bizar, who was interested in their role-playing game Chevalier they had brought with them but decided not to sell to TSR; Bizar helped guide the game to print over the next year as Chivalry & Sorcery, the first RPG from FGU. In the late 1970s, Bizar was looking for a new science-fiction roleplaying game to act as one of FGU's flagships, and contacted Simbalist and Phil McGregor to produce the game, which was published in 1980 as Space Opera. During the process, Bizar never met Simbalist or McGregor, or A. Mark Ratner, and the project was completed over more than two years entirely by correspondence. In the early 1980s, Bizar started picking up product lines from defunct publishers, which brought Bushido and Aftermath! to FGU in 1981. FGU purchased the rights to Swordbearer (1982), and also bought Heritage's old stock, something that Bizar felt was a necessary part of such a deal; FGU published their own edition in 1985. In 1987, Bizar was considering new locations for FGU that could offer him reduced warehousing costs, and decided on Arizona, the home of friend Rick Loomis and his gaming company, Flying Buffalo. Bizar rented office space and warehouse in Tempe, but since FGU was having difficulties Bizar took jobs as first a car salesman and then a school teacher. Bizar was intent on staying in the hobbyist industry, and founded a game shop in Gilbert, Arizona called Waterloo, using stock from his parents, who were running their own Waterloo game stores in New York; the FGU offices and warehouse were soon moved to this new location. After founding a second store in Phoenix, Arizona, Bizar was hit by massive fraud at the Gilbert store, when an employee took out credit cards in Bizar's name, opened fake bank accounts, and fraudulently offered up Bizar's stores as collateral; Bizar lost money due to the fraud and was also forced to fight lawsuits over the next years originating from it, and eventually had to close down the Phoenix store in 1996. Bizar had been getting some older FGU books back into print, while preparing new books for publication, but the fraud put an end to all that.

All of FGU's game actually belonged to their authors, but despite FGU's disappearance by the late 1980s, Bizar claimed that the products remained in print because he continued to sell backstock through his own store, and he claimed ownership over all of the FGU trademarks - which he stated did not revert to their authors, even if the rest of the game rights did. In 1996, Gold Rush Games prepared to publish a third edition of Bushido under license from the authors, but Bizar rushed the game back into print and notified Gold Rush Games that he would sue if their new edition was released. Through the general means of threatened lawsuits, Bizar has managed to keep almost all of the FGU properties off the market; he generally seems willing to sell rights but with the cost including the purchase of all backstock. In 2000, Bizar started a website that sells the extensive FGU backstock that still exists, and has continued producing his reproductions of old FGU material. Bizar printed a few new books, including a second edition of Dinosaur Games' Aftermath! Technology! (2008) and two other David Harmer supplements that had not been previously printed: Aftermath! Magic! (2010) and the Aftermath! Survival Guide (2008); Bizar similarly published a number of original PDFs for Villains & Vigilantes for free through the website (2010). Jeff Dee and Jack Herman contended that they had contracted with FGU Inc., not Bizar, and that this means that Bizar no longer had the rights to publish V&V; the two sent Bizar a cease-and-desist letter in June 2010, instructing him that he was no longer allowed to sell their games, and then Dee and Herman published version 2.1 of Villains & Vigilantes (2010) under their new Monkey House Games brand. As of early 2011, Bizar had refused a license that would give him the right to continue publishing Villains & Vigilantes material and had also refused arbitration with Dee and Herman, although Dee and Herman say it's required by their contract. Bizar printed a few Giant volumes that collected old V&V books as well as some brand new releases such as Escape from the Micro-Universe (2011) for V&V and The Gauntlet (2011) for Aftermath! .

References

External links
 Scott Bizar:: Pen & Paper RPG Database archive

Living people
Role-playing game designers
Year of birth missing (living people)